The Raymond C. and Mildred Kramer House is an early Modern 6,800 square foot townhouse at 32 East 74th Street (between Madison Avenue and Park Avenue) in the Upper East Side Historic District in  Manhattan, New York City, New York in the United States.

History 

Its architect was Swiss-born-and-trained William Lescaze, and it was built for textile merchant and U.S. Colonel Raymond C. Kramer and his wife from 1934 to 1935.

In 2008, the townhouse was sold for $12 million, and in 2015 it was sold for $15.9 million.

In December 2017, after renovation, the house was back on sale with a $20 million price tag.

Description 

The townhouse is composed of glass, glass blocks and frosted glass casement windows, white stucco,  blue-enameled steel panels, a projecting marquee, and a curved, inset front entrance.  It has five bedrooms, four bathrooms, a solarium, a winter garden, and a terrace.

See also 

 Lescaze House, William Lescaze's own house, designed in a similar style
 Architecture of New York City
 Early American modernism

References 

Houses completed in 1935
1935 establishments in New York City
Houses in Manhattan
Upper East Side
Modernist architecture in New York City